Gómez Suárez de Figueroa y Córdoba, 3rd Duke of Feria (1 September 1587 – 1634) was a Spanish nobleman, diplomat and army commander during the 17th century.

Life and career
He was the son of Lorenzo Suárez de Figueroa y Córdoba, who he succeeded in 1607 as third Duke of Feria and second Marquis of Villalba (1604–1634). His mother was his father's third wife.

Don Gómez was known as the Gran Duque de Feria for his military skills. He can be considered as one of the last able military commanders of the Spanish Empire. He was also Viceroy of Valencia, Viceroy of Catalonia, Governor of Milan, state councilor, and special ambassador to Rome and France. He died in 1634 in Munich from typhoid.

He first married Francisca Cardona y Córdoba, and later Ana Fernández de Córdoba y Figueroa, who gave him a son, Gaspar Lorenzo Suárez de Figueroa y Córdoba (1629–1634). He became the fourth Duke of Feria and third Marquis of Villalba (1634), after the death of his father and grandfather. The boy died in the same year at the age of five. The title went to the boy's maternal grandfather, the Marquis of Priego.

References

1587 births
1634 deaths
Viceroys of Catalonia
Viceroys of Valencia
103
Margraves of Villalba
Spanish generals